Sinners and Saints is a 2010  action-thriller film directed by and co-written by William Kaufman and starring Johnny Strong, Kevin Phillips, Costas Mandylor, Sean Patrick Flanery, Bas Rutten, Method Man, Kim Coates and Tom Berenger. The film is set in the dark underbelly of New Orleans. It was released in North America on DVD and Blu-ray on January 10, 2012.

Plot
Sean Riley, a detective with the New Orleans Police Department, is emotionally drained since the death of his young son and resulting end of his marriage. He is further troubled by the death of his partner, Det. Dave Besson. Riley's commander, Captain Trahan, assigns Riley to investigate a series of murders involving victims who have been burned. One of the victims is the younger brother of infamous gangster Weddo, which has sparked a gang war in the city.

Riley is approached by Colin, a friend he had lost touch with. Colin tells Riley that since they served in the military together, he has gotten various freelance jobs with a private security company called Spartan.

Riley is assigned a new partner, Detective Will Ganz, a stable family man. They stumble into a group of mercenaries in the act of burning another victim, and a shootout ensues.

Riley and Ganz learn that a man named Raymond Crowe hired the mercenaries. As the investigation continues, Riley learns that Colin is in possession of incriminating evidence against Spartan: a video of the same mercenaries from the shootout executing innocents while on assignment. When the partners track down Colin, they are attacked by the mercenaries, now revealed to be Spartan Security. A mortally wounded Colin blows up the house he is in so that Riley and Ganz can escape.

When Riley learns from Captain Trahan that the city wants to blame Riley for the disastrous results of the investigation, Riley decides to take matters into his own hands. Trahan goes to Riley’s home to try to talk him out of it, but is ambushed and killed by Dekker, a leader of the Spartan mercenaries. Dekker attacks Riley, but Riley manages to kill him.

Riley learns that Crowe has kidnapped Ganz. He breaks into Crowe's stronghold and kills the remaining mercenaries. Crowe manages to escape, as Riley gives chase. Crowe manages to shoot Riley, but Riley shoots him down in the street. Riley is about to kill Crowe, with Ganz shouting at him to do it, but Riley decides not to. Weddo and his gang arrive and take Crowe with them, presumably to kill him.

Later, Riley visits Ganz's child's birthday party, then visits the cemetery where his own son is buried.

Cast

References

External links 
 
 

2010 action thriller films
2010 films
Films shot in New Orleans
Films set in New Orleans
Films about Hurricane Katrina
American action thriller films
2010s English-language films
Films directed by William Kaufman
2010s American films